Maginnis & Walsh was an architecture firm started by Charles Donagh Maginnis and Timothy Walsh in 1905. It was known for its innovative design of churches in Boston in the first half of the twentieth century.

Partners

Maginnis was born January 7, 1867, in Derry, Ireland. He emigrated to Boston at age 18 and got his first job apprenticing for architect Edmund M. Wheelwright as a draftsman. Influenced by the work of modern architect Ralph Adams Cram, Maginnis became a distinguished Gothic architect and an articulate writer and orator on the role of architecture in society. In 1948 Maginnis received the AIA Gold Medal for "outstanding service to American architecture," the highest award in the profession. He died in 1955 at the age of eighty-eight in Brookline, Massachusetts.

Timothy Francis Walsh was born in 1868 in Cambridge, Massachusetts. He attended The English High School in Boston, and worked as a draftsman for Peabody and Stearns from 1887 to 1893, when he left to study in Europe. Walsh returned to Boston in 1895 and went into business as Walsh & Kearns. He worked as a solo practitioner in 1896 and 1897, and 1898 went into partnership with Charles Donagh Maginnis and Matthew Sullivan. He died on July 7, 1934, at the age of sixty-six in North Scituate.

Matthew Sullivan was born in Boston and trained in the office of Edmund M. Wheelwright, Boston City Architect (1891-1894). Sullivan succeeded Wheelwright as City Architect and served in that position from 1895 to 1901, when he became a junior partner in the firm of Maginnis, Walsh and Sullivan, which was widely known for its ecclesiastical work. He withdrew from that partnership to carry on work independently in 1906.

Between the firm's founding in 1898 and the death of Timothy Walsh in 1934, the firm is credited with over 115 ecclesiastical works. The Maginnis and Walsh collection at the Boston Public Library contains work of the architectural firm from 1913 to 1952.

Eugene F. Kennedy Jr. was born in Brooklyn, New York January 31, 1904, to Eugene F. Kennedy Sr. and Anna T. Lee. The family had moved to the Boston area by 1910. In 1924, he was awarded the Rotch Traveling Scholarship, established by architect Arthur Rotch to provide an American student of architecture a minimum of eight months study and travel abroad. Kennedy joined M&W in 1926, and married Carol Gertrude Fox (1903-1975) in 1928. He became a senior partner in the firm in 1941, which became known as Maginnis and Walsh and Kennedy. Kennedy died November 7, 1986, in Jamaica Plain, Boston.

Maginnis, Walsh and Sullivan (1898–1905)

 St. Patrick's Roman Catholic Church, Whitinsville, Massachusetts, Diocese of Worcester (1898). (very influential, referred to as the 'Concord Bridge' of Catholic church architecture, Maginnis' first church).
 St. John the Evangelist Church (Cambridge, Massachusetts): The church was built in 1904, largely built by Irish immigrants. House Speaker "Tip" O'Neill, was a lifelong parishioner. Modeled after a 12th century Lombardo-Romanesque basilica, of four gold medals awarded to Maginnis, Walsh and Sullivan from the American Institute of Architects, one was for St. John's. It was added to the National Register of Historic Places in 1983.
 St. Thomas the Apostle Catholic Church (Los Angeles): The Mission Revival style church was built in 1904. The Los Angeles Times, said, "In its character this church unites itself with the days of the humble followers of St. Francis, as it is the same form and the same faith, is to a great degree of the same style of architecture and is carried on by the same authority as that of the olden days."

Brighton, Massachusetts
Now a neighborhood of Boston, Brighton was a farming community just northwest of the city. The farms became estates, the estates came into the possession of religious institutes. M&W had a number of commissions in Brighton.

One of the earliest was * St. John's Seminary Chapel in Brighton, designed in 1898 in the Romanesque Revival style. It was constructed in 1899 of yellow and gray Brighton pudding stone with limestone trimmings. Our Lady of the Presentation Catholic Church in the Oak Square neighborhood of the Brighton section of Boston was begun in 1913 and completed in 1921. The parish closed in 2005; in 2013 the building was reopened as St. John's Seminary Our Lady of the Presentation Lecture Hall and Library.

The Convent of the Sisters of the Cenacle in Brighton was built in 1911. The building now houses the EF Language Institute.

In 1908 the Passionist Fathers purchased the David Nevins Estate in Brighton and built St. Gabriel's Monastery. In 1927 M&W was engaged to design a church to replace the chapel. St. Gabriel's is in the Renaissance Revival architecture style, constructed of buff-colored brick with cast stone accents and red mission tile roof. Due to personnel shortages, the monastery closed in 1978; St. Gabriel's Parish Church in 2006. In 2017 plans were approved to convert the monastery property into a combination of condominiums and apartments, largely geared to graduate students. The plan also has an affordable housing component. St. Gabriel's Church is to be retained and renovated as a community center.

Maginnis and Walsh (1906–1940)

In the Boston area the firm built St. Catherine of Genoa Church on Spring Hill in Somerville, Massachusetts, regarded as a masterpiece. St. Catherine's, was begun in 1907 and completed in 1921. In July 2019, St. Catherine's. St. Ann's, and St. Thomas merged to form Sts. Louis and Zelie Martin Parish; masses are still scheduled at St. Catherine's.

St. Mary's School (Taunton, Massachusetts) built in 1907, is a three-story brick building in Collegiate Gothic style. The Girls' Latin School, Huntington Avenue Building was built in 1907 in collaboration with Peabody & Stearns and Coolidge & Carlson.

In 1914, the firm designed the administration building of Emmanuel College. Located in the Fens area of Boston, it was founded by the Sisters of Notre Dame de Namur and opened in 1919 as the first women's Catholic college in New England. For thirty years, it was the only building on campus.

The firm also designed St. Edward’s church in Brockton, Massachusetts, in 1914.  St. Edward’s Church was founded in 1915, and merged with St. Nicholas Church in Abington, Massachusetts, in 2003, with the combined parish being renamed St. Edith Stein.  St. Edith Stein parish bears striking resemblance to Ascension of Our Lord Church in Montreal, Canada, which is another church designed by the firm.

The Church of Ascension of Our Lord was built between 1927 and 1928, for the English-speaking Roman Catholic population in Westmount municipality of Montreal, Canada on land originally belonging to the Grey Nuns. It was designed by Maginnis & Walsh of Boston, Massachusetts, with Edward J. Turcotte of Montreal as Associate Architect.  Its architect, Maginnis & Walsh was “based in Boston and was considered the foremost specialist in Catholic ecclesiastical architecture of the period. The church is built on a monumental scale. Although its architectural style looks to the Gothic churches of Europe, its construction was modern for the period: a steel frame, encased in brick or concrete and clad in Montreal limestone, with Berea sandstone trim. The plan is a conventional Latin cross, the intersection of the nave and the transepts marked by an imposing bell tower. The front façade, facing Sherbrooke Street, is dominated by a gabled wall, flanked by shallow buttresses. Three lancet windows surmount a secondary, projecting gable, which contains the central entrance.”  Ascension of Our Lord Church’s design may be based on or influenced by the firm’s 1914 design of St. Edward’s Church (now St. Edith Stein Church) in Brockton, MA.

In 1929 the firm designed Our Lady of Sorrows Church in South Orange, New Jersey, in the French Gothic style, to replace the 1889 St Mary's.

Boston College, Chestnut Hill

Maginnis & Walsh won the bid to build the new campus of Boston College in Chestnut Hill, Massachusetts. Designed by Maginnis, in 1908, the Boston College campus is a seminal example of Collegiate Gothic architecture. Combining Gothic Revival architecture with principles of Beaux-Arts planning, Maginnis proposed a vast complex of academic buildings set in a cruciform plan. The design suggested an enormous outdoor cathedral, with the long entry drive at the "nave," the main quadrangle at the "apse" and secondary quadrangles at the "transepts." Maginnis's design broke from the traditional Oxbridge models that had inspired it—and that had until then characterized Gothic architecture on American campuses. At the "crossing", Maginnis placed the university's main building. Using stone quarried on the site, the building was constructed at the highest point on Chestnut Hill, commanding a view of the surrounding landscape and the city to the east. In its unprecedented scale, Gasson Tower was conceived not as the belfry of a singular building, but as the crowning campanile of Maginnis' new "city upon a hill". Dominated by a soaring 200-foot bell tower, Recitation Hall was known simply as the "Tower Building" when it finally opened in 1913. Gasson Hall is credited for the typology of dominant Gothic towers in subsequent campus designs, including those at Princeton (Cleveland Tower, 1913–1917), Yale (Harkness Tower, 1917–1921), and Duke (Chapel Tower, 1930–1935).

Although Maginnis' ambitious Gothic project never saw full completion due to the Wall Street Crash of 1929, its central portion was built according to plan and forms the core of what is now BC's iconic middle campus. According to Boston College historian, Fr. Charles F. Donovan,  Gasson Hall (1913) (The signature building of BC), St. Mary's Hall and Chapel (1917), Devlin Hall (1924), and Bapst Library (commissioned 1922, completed 1928), called the "finest example of Collegiate Gothic architecture in America"), are the "original architectural gems" of the campus. In 1926, the Devlin Hall science building won the Harleston Parker Medal for "most beautiful building in Boston". M&W also built Fulton Hall (1948), Lyons Hall (1951), St. Thomas More Hall (1954 -demolished 2014), and Campion (1955).<ref>[http://bcm.bc.edu/issues/fall_2014/endnotes/workhouse.html Birnbaum, Ben. "The Brief, Effective Life of More Hall", Boston College Magazine, Fall 2014]</ref>

Maginnis also designed the chancel at Trinity Church in Copley Square, the high altar at St. Patrick's Cathedral, New York, and the Massachusetts Veterans War Memorial Tower on the summit of Mount Greylock.

The firm also built St. Aidan's Church (Brookline, Massachusetts) (1911) where Maginnis was a parishioner. The church where John F. Kennedy was christened, St. Aidan's, has since been closed and converted to housing.

Maginnis and Walsh and Kennedy (1941–1956)
Maginnis designed the bronze doors at St. Patrick's Cathedral (Manhattan) to replace the original wooden ones. Each 16 1/2-foot by 5 1/2-foot door weighs 9,200 pounds and is decorated with sculptures of saints created by John Angel. The doors were blessed by Cardinal Spellman and opened for the first time just before Christmas 1949. In 2013, the doors underwent a major conservation and restoration.

Maginnis and Walsh were the original architects for St. Julia Church, in Weston, Massachusetts, in 1919. The firm returned in 1961 to design an addition to the back of St. Julia Church to increase seating capacity.

Works

Archdiocese of Boston
 Immaculate Conception Lithuanian Church, Cambridge, Massachusetts: dedicated 1913, sold in 2007 and repurposed for affordable housing.
 St. Catherine of Sienna Church, Norwood, Massachusetts
 St. George Church, Norwood, Massachusetts
 Most Blessed Sacrament Church, Greenwood, Wakefield, Massachusetts
 Campion Renewal Center (former Jesuit Novitiate), Weston, Massachusetts
 St. Paul Church, Dorchester, Massachusetts
 St. Theresa of Avila Church, West Roxbury, Massachusetts
 Our Lady of Mercy Church, Belmont, Massachusetts
 St. Raphael Church, Medford, Massachusetts (destroyed, replaced by Keefe Associates)
 St. Angela Church, Mattapan, Massachusetts (superstructure, basement by Patrick C. Keely)
 St. Teresa Church, Watertown, Massachusetts (closed, converted to housing)
 St. Aidan Church, Brookline, Massachusetts (closed, converted to housing)
 St. Edith Stein Church, Brockton, Massachusetts (formerly St. Edward’s Church)
 Sacred Heart Church, Roslindale, Massachusetts (replacement of destroyed tower, interior redesign of 1890 Patrick W. Ford church)
 Sacred Heart School, Roslindale, Massachusetts
 Sacred Heart Church, Manchester, Massachusetts (demolished)
 St. Mathias Church, Marlboro, Massachusetts
 Trinity Episcopal Church, Copley Square, Boston, Massachusetts (chancel remodeling of famous H.H. Richardson church)

Diocese of Worcester
 St. Joseph Church, Fitchburg, Massachusetts
 St. Leo Church, Leominster, Massachusetts
 Dinand Library, College of the Holy Cross, Worcester, Massachusetts
 St. Joseph's Chapel, College of the Holy Cross, Worcester, Massachusetts

Diocese of Fall River
 St. James Church, New Bedford, Massachusetts (alteration to church by Patrick W. Ford)
 Holy Name Church, New Bedford, Massachusetts
 St. Joseph Church, Taunton, Massachusetts
 Holy Family Church, East Taunton, Massachusetts
 St. William Church, Fall River, Massachusetts (basement only)
 Holy Name Church, Fall River, Massachusetts
 Our Lady of the Immaculate Conception Church, Fall River, Massachusetts (demolished)
 St. John the Evangelist Church, Pocasset, Massachusetts
 St. Margaret Church, Buzzards Bay, Massachusetts
 St. Patrick Church, Falmouth, Massachusetts
 St. Teresa Church, Sagamore, Massachusetts
 St. Bernard Church, Assonet, Massachusetts
 Holy Trinity Church, Brewster, Massachusetts
 Holy Trinity Church, West Harwich, Massachusetts (burned, replaced)
 St. Patrick Church, Wareham, Massachusetts
 St. John The Evangelist Church, Attleboro, Massachusetts
 St. Mary of the Assumption Rectory

Diocese of Springfield
Blessed Sacrament Church, Northampton, Massachusetts

Diocese of Providence
 St. Raymond Church, Providence, Rhode Island (demolished)

Diocese of Burlington Vermont
 St. Stephen Church, Winooski, Vermont
 St. Dominic Church, Proctor, Vermont
 Christ the King Church, Rutland, Vermont

Diocese of Portland, Maine
 Sacred Heart Church, Hallowell, Maine
 Immaculate Conception Church, Fairfield, Maine

Archdiocese of Hartford
 Basilica of The Immaculate Conception, Waterbury, Connecticut

Archdiocese of Cincinnati
 St. Louis Church, Cincinnati, Ohio
 St. Joseph Church, Dayton, Ohio
 Holy Angels Church, Dayton, Ohio

Archdiocese of New York
 St. Andrew Church (Manhattan), New York (with Robert J. Reilly)
 Regis High School (New York City)
 St. Patrick's Cathedral, New York, New York (new Lady Chapel altar, new high altar and Baldachino, cathedral designed by James Renwick Jr.)
 Maryknoll Seminary Building, Ossining, New York

Diocese of Brooklyn
 Our Lady Queen of Martyrs Church, Forest Hills, New York

Diocese of Albany
 St. James Church (now St. Francis of Assisi Church), Albany, New York

Diocese of Ogdensburg
 St. Mary's Cathedral, Ogdensburg, New York

Diocese of Marquette (Michigan)
 St. Peter Cathedral, Marquette, Michigan

Archdiocese of Newark
 Our Lady of Sorrows Church, South Orange, New Jersey
 Holy Name of Jesus Church, East Orange, New Jersey
 St. Vincent DePaul Church, Bayonne, New Jersey

Archdiocese of Baltimore
 Cathedral of Mary Our Queen, Baltimore, Maryland
 St. Ambrose Church, Baltimore, Maryland
 Chapel, St. Mary Seminary, Baltimore, Maryland
 Church, Loyola College, Baltimore, Maryland
 Our Lady of Lourdes Chapel, Georgetown Preparatory School, Garrett Park, Maryland

Archdiocese of Philadelphia
 Holy Name Church, Philadelphia, Pennsylvania
 Carmelite Monastery, Philadelphia, 1914

Diocese of Scranton
 St. Paul Church, Scranton, Pennsylvania

Archdiocese of Washington, D.C.
 Basilica of the National Shrine of the Immaculate Conception, Washington, D.C.
 Sacred Heart Church Washington, D.C. (Murphy & Olmsted, architects, Maginnis and Walsh, associate architects)
 Chapel, Trinity College, Washington, D.C.
 St. Gabriel Church, Washington, D.C.
 New Apostolic Mission House, Washington, D.C.

Diocese of Gary, Indiana
 unnamed church, Gary, Indiana

Archdiocese of Milwaukee
 St. Robert Church, Shorewood, Wisconsin

Archdiocese of San Francisco
 Carmelite Monastery, Santa Clara, California

Archdiocese of Los Angeles
 Cathedral of Saint Vibiana, Los Angeles, California (plans submitted but cathedral not built)
 St Agnes Church, Los Angeles
 Our Lady Queen of Angels Church, Los Angeles

Archdiocese of Dubuque
 unnamed church, Dubuque, Iowa

Diocese of Des Moines
 All Saints Church, Stuart, Iowa
 St. Anthony Church, Des Moines, Iowa
 St. Augustin Church, Des Moines, Iowa
 Basilica of St. John, Des Moines, Iowa

Diocese of Cheyenne
 Chapel, St. Joseph's Children's Home, Torrington, Wyoming
 Our Lady of Sorrows Church, Rock Springs, Wyoming

Schools, colleges, universities, and seminaries

The Catholic University of America, Washington, D.C.
 Basilica of The National Shrine of The Immaculate Conception (started in 1919; completed 1959). The largest Catholic Church in North America.  "The architectural style is composite of a Romanesque exterior and a Byzantine interior."''

Georgetown Preparatory School, Rockville, MD
 Our Lady of the Lourdes Chapel

College of the Holy Cross, Worcester, MA
 Dinand Library – 1927
 Saint Joseph Memorial Chapel – 1922

Newton Country Day School of the Sacred Heart
  Chapel and 4-story wing

Regis High School, New York City, NY

Sacred Heart School, Fall River, MA

Saint Joseph's School, Wakefield, MA – 1924

Saint Joseph College, West Hartford, CT
 McDonough and Mercy Halls – 1935

St. Mary's Seminary and University, Baltimore, MD
 Main Administration Building – 1929  (Beaux Arts Classical Revival Style).

Trinity Washington University (formerly Trinity College), Washington, D.C.
 Notre Dame Chapel – 1924
 Alumnae Hall – 1929

University of Northwestern (formerly Northwestern College) St. Paul, MN
 Nazareth Hall – 1923
 Nazareth Hall Chapel – 1923
 Island Chapel and Peninsula – 1925

University of Notre Dame, South Bend, IN
 Biolchini Hall of Law – 1930
 Alumni Hall – 1931
 Dillon Hall – 1931
 Knights of Columbus (formerly Old Post Office) – 1934
 Student Health Center (now St. Liam's Hall) – 1934
 Cavanaugh Hall – 1936
 Haggar Hall (formerly Biology Building) – 1937
 Zahm Hall – 1937
 Breen-Phillips Hall – 1939
 Facilities Building (formerly Ave Maria Press)- 1940
 Hessert Laboratory for Aerospace Research (formerly Heat and Power Laboratory) – 1941
 Farley Hall – 1947
 Nieuwland Science Hall – 1952

Hospitals

Boston's Children Hospital?
References to "Children's Hospital" are found in "[Boston] City Auditor's of the Receipts and Expenses" Reports (1912–1913, 1913–1914, 1914–1915); and the "Documents City of Boston, For The Year 1914."

Uncertain if this facility is within the "Boston Consumptives Hospital" campus or a separate facility altogether.

Boston Consumptives Hospital (Boston Sanatorium)
A "tuberculosis hospital," this 52-acres campus had 18 buildings), Dorchester, MA
 Administration or Foley Building (1910, 1928–1930) (The largest building on campus)
 Doctors' residences, Dormitories or Wards (4) (ca. 1910) (currently vacant and are decaying [reported 2016])
 The Power House (1903)

Outside United States
 Ascension of Our Lord Church, Westmount, Montreal, Quebec, Canada
 Holy Redeemer Cathedral, Corner Brook, Newfoundland, Canada
 Our Lady of the Snows Church, Campbellton New Brunswick, Canada
 St. Patrick Church, Mexico City, Mexico

See also
 Maginnis, Walsh and Sullivan

References

Defunct architecture firms based in Massachusetts
Companies based in Boston
Architects from Boston
American ecclesiastical architects
Architects of Roman Catholic churches